Andrew Mumford may refer to:
 Andrew Mumford (footballer)
 Andrew Mumford (political scientist)